The Amratian culture, also called Naqada I, was an archaeological culture of prehistoric Upper Egypt. It lasted approximately from 4000 to 3500 BC.

Overview

El-Amra was the first site where this culture group was found without being mingled with the later Gerzeh culture (Naqada II). However, this period is better attested at the Nagada site, thus it also is referred to as the Naqada I culture. Black-topped pottery continued to be produced, but white cross-line pottery, a type which has been decorated with close parallel white lines being crossed by another set of close parallel white lines, begins to be produced during this time. The Amratian falls between S.D. 30 and 39 in Flinders Petrie's sequence dating system.

The Amratians possessed slaves and constructed rowboats of bundled papyrus in which they could sail the Nile. Trade between the Amratian culture bearers in Upper Egypt and populations of Lower Egypt is attested during this time through new excavated objects. A stone vase from the north has been found at el-Amra. The predecessor Badarian culture had also discovered that malachite could be heated into copper beads; the Amratians shaped this metal by chipping. Obsidian and a very small amount of gold were both imported from Nubia during this time. Trade with the oases also was likely. Cedar was imported from Byblos, marble from Paros, as well as emery from Naxos.

New innovations such as adobe buildings, for which the Gerzeh culture is well known, also begin to appear during this time, attesting to cultural continuity. However, they did not reach nearly the widespread use that they were known for in later times. Additionally, oval and theriomorphic cosmetic palettes appear to be used in this period. However, the workmanship was still very rudimentary and the relief artwork for which they were later known is not yet present.

Each Amratian village had an animal deity; amulets were worn of humans and various animals including birds and fish. Food, weaponry, statuettes, decorations, malachite, and occasionally dogs were buried with the deceased.

Early cosmetic palettes

Siltstone was first utilized for cosmetic palettes by the Badari culture. The first palettes used in the Badarian Period and in Naqada I were usually plain, rhomboidal or rectangular in shape, without any further decoration. It is in the Naqada II period in which the zoomorphic palette is most common.

Bearded figurines

Many figurines are known from Naqada I, which were carved on animal tusks. The figurines usually have pointed beards, and some trace of hair. They may represent people dressed in long cloaks. Bearded men also appear in many other pre-dynastic artifacts, such as the Gebel el-Arak Knife. The headgear of the Mesopotamian-style "Lord of Animals" on the Gebel el-Arak knife may also be comparable to the torus-shaped headgear visible on many of the Naqada I figurines.

Other artifacts

Relative chronology

See also

5.9 kiloyear event
Prehistoric Egypt 
Naqada culture
Naqada III

References
Footnotes

Citations

 
4th millennium BC in Egypt
Neolithic cultures of Africa
Predynastic Egypt
4th-millennium BC establishments
4th-millennium BC disestablishments
Archaeological cultures in Egypt
Upper Egypt